Parchevich Ridge (Parchevich Rid \'par-che-vich 'rid\) is a partly ice-free ridge of elevation 370 m situated in Breznik Heights north of Hardy Cove, 690 m south of Benkovski Nunatak, and 1.7 km southwest of Santa Cruz Point on Greenwich Island, Antarctica.  Surmounting Hardy Cove to the southwest and Gruev Cove to the east-northeast.  Bulgarian topographic survey Tangra 2004/05. Named after Petar Parchevich (1612–74), a Bulgarian Catholic bishop and diplomat who campaigned for Bulgarian independence in 1630–45.

Maps
 L.L. Ivanov et al. Antarctica: Livingston Island and Greenwich Island, South Shetland Islands. Scale 1:100000 topographic map. Sofia: Antarctic Place-names Commission of Bulgaria, 2005.
 L.L. Ivanov. Antarctica: Livingston Island and Greenwich, Robert, Snow and Smith Islands. Scale 1:120000 topographic map.  Troyan: Manfred Wörner Foundation, 2009.

References
 Parchevich Ridge. SCAR Composite Gazetteer of Antarctica
 Bulgarian Antarctic Gazetteer. Antarctic Place-names Commission. (details in Bulgarian, basic data in English)

External links
 Parchevich Ridge. Copernix satellite image

Ridges of Greenwich Island
Bulgaria and the Antarctic